The 2018–19 Radford Highlanders men's basketball team represented Radford University during the 2018–19 NCAA Division I men's basketball season. The Highlanders, led by eighth-year head coach Mike Jones, played their home games at the Dedmon Center in Radford, Virginia as members of the Big South Conference.

Previous season
The Highlanders finished the season 23–13, 12–6 in Big South play to finish in a tie for second place. They defeated Longwood, Winthrop, and Liberty to become champions of the Big South tournament. The received the Big South's automatic bid to the NCAA tournament where they defeated LIU Brooklyn in the First Four before losing in the first round to Villanova.

Roster

Schedule and results

|-
!colspan=9 style=| Exhibition

|-
!colspan=9 style=| Non-conference regular season

|-
!colspan=9 style=| Big South Conference regular season

|-
!colspan=9 style=| Big South tournament

References 

Radford Highlanders men's basketball seasons
Radford
Radford
Radford